Terrence Jenkins (born April 21, 1982) is an American actor, television presenter, model and entertainment reporter best known as the host of BET's popular music video countdown show 106 & Park from 2006 until 2012. He was the co-anchor of E! News from 2012 until 2015.

Early life
Jenkins was born in Queens, New York, and grew up mostly in  Rocky Mount, North Carolina. He attended Northern Nash High in Rocky Mount. During this time, Jenkins worked at WRSV Soul 92.1 as a DJ until he graduated from high school. He spent his college years at North Carolina A&T State University; he also lived in Greensboro. During his time at North Carolina A&T State University, he served as Student Government Association President and as a DJ for North Carolina A&T's radio station WNAA. He also worked as a DJ at local radio station 102 Jamz in Greensboro. Jenkins is a member of Omega Psi Phi fraternity where he later was initiated in spring 2004 to the Mu Psi chapter at North Carolina A&T State University. After graduating from North Carolina A&T State University in 2004 with a degree in mass communication, Jenkins worked in the diversity office of Nascar in Daytona Beach, Florida.

Career 

Jenkins and Rocsi became the hosts of BET's hip hop/R&B music video television program 106 & Park after winning the BET New Faces Contest on July 6, 2006. Since its inception, it had been the network's number-one rated show. After hosting the show for six years, Rocsi and Jenkins announced they would be leaving 106 & Park in 2012. His last show was broadcast on September 28, 2012, but returned on December 19, 2014 with the finale special, titled "The Final Act" alongside former and current hosts such as A.J. Calloway and Bow Wow. He also co-hosted BET’s nationally syndicated radio show 106 & Park Weekend Countdown.

He appeared in two films: The Heart Specialist (2006) and Stomp the Yard: Homecoming (2010). In 2008, he made a cameo appearance in British R&B singer Estelle's music video for her single with Kanye West, titled "American Boy". In 2009, Jenkins appeared on E!'s reality television series Kourtney and Khloé Take Miami, a spin-off series of Keeping Up with the Kardashians starring Kourtney and Khloé Kardashian. He co-hosted the radio show "Khloé After Dark" on Y100. Jenkins portrayed DJ Dave in the 2010 musical film Burlesque, starring Christina Aguilera and Cher. In 2011, he had a recurring role as Danté Young on the BET comedy-drama television series The Game. On September 4, 2012, Jenkins was named the co-anchor of E! News, replacing Ryan Seacrest.

Jenkins starred as Michael Hanover in the romantic comedy film Think Like A Man (2012), which grossed $96 million at the worldwide box office. He reprised his role as Michael Hanover in the film's sequel Think Like a Man Too (2014), which opened at number one at the box office, grossing $29.2 million. The film earned $70.2 million at the worldwide box office against a budget of $24 million. He also appeared in films Sparkle (2012), Baggage Claim (2013), Battle of the Year (2013) and Entourage (2015). Jenkins landed the lead role of Charlie "Mack" McIntyre in the romantic comedy film The Perfect Match (2016) opposite Cassie Ventura. The film centers around playboy Charlie, who is convinced that all his relationships are dead, but his best friends bet him that if he sticks to one woman for one month, he is bound to fall in love. Jenkins hosted Miss USA beauty pageant with Julianne Hough between 2016 and 2017. 

His first book, titled "The Wealth of My Mother's Wisdom" was released by HarperCollins on October 1, 2013. The book was inspired by the lessons his mother taught him and her extraordinary journey of raising Jenkins while she was still a teenager. "I know that many of the successful moments in my life, personally and professionally, have been in part because of the lessons that she taught me, and I am proud to share her words of wisdom to inspire others," he told E! News in 2013 

Since 2017, Jenkins has hosted MTV's reality television series Are You the One? starting in season 6. Jenkins hosted 16 episodes of Starz crime drama TV series Power's official aftershow, Power Confidential. In 2019, Jenkins played for the "Home" roster during the NBA All-Star Celebrity Game at the Bojangles' Coliseum in Charlotte, North Carolina. The roster was made up of celebrities with North Carolinian roots.

Personal life
He was involved in a hit-and-run incident in 2018, and was pursued and shot at by robbers in 2021.

Filmography

References

External links
 
 
 
 White T movie

1982 births
Male actors from North Carolina
Living people
North Carolina A&T State University alumni
People from Queens, New York
Actors from Raleigh, North Carolina
People from Rocky Mount, North Carolina